Culex (Lophoceraomyia) minutissimus is a species of mosquito belonging to the genus Culex. It is found in Bangladesh, India, Indonesia, Java, Borneo, China, Malaysia, Maldives, Pakistan, Sri Lanka and Thailand.

References 

minutissimus
Insects described in 1907